Abdol Amir (also Romanized as ʿAbdol Āmīr) is a village in Shoaybiyeh-ye Sharqi Rural District, Shadravan District, Shushtar County, Khuzestan Province, Iran. At the 2006 census, its population was 165, in 32 families.

References 

Populated places in Shushtar County